Early Stage may refer to:

 Early Life Stage test, a toxicity test using embryo or larvae
 Early stage cancer, referred to as the Clinical Classification of cancer
 Early Stages, a box set by rock band Marillion
 Early Years Foundation Stage, from Section 39 of the Childcare Act 2006 in the United Kingdom
 God of Gamblers 3: The Early Stage, 1997 Hong-Kong film
 Monstercat 002 – Early Stage, a 2011 compilation album by Monstercat

See also 
 Educational stage